Chak Bhagtupur is a village in Batala in Gurdaspur district of Punjab State, India. The village is administrated by Sarpanch.

Demography 
, The village has a total number of 13 houses and the population of 67 of which 33 are males while 34 are females according to the report published by Census India in 2011. The literacy rate of the village is 73.33%, lower than the state average of 75.84%. The population of children under the age of 6 years is 3 which is 4.48% of total population of the village, and child sex ratio is approximately 0 lower than the state average of 846.

See also
List of villages in India

References 

Villages in Gurdaspur district